Taras Rajec (born 5 June 1988 in Lviv) is a Ukrainian-born former figure skater who competed internationally for Slovakia. He is the 2012 Slovak national champion.

Programs

Competitive highlights

References

External links

 

Slovak male single skaters
1988 births
Living people
Sportspeople from Lviv
Ukrainian emigrants to Slovakia